Jerry Churchill (September 18, 1938 – June 7, 2008) was a Canadian professional stock car racing driver.

Racing career
Churchill made seven NASCAR Winston Cup Series and seven NASCAR SuperTruck Series starts in his career. He was the first non-American driver to compete in NASCAR SuperTruck Series. He also competed in ARCA Racing Series with 130 starts and had 1 win at Kil-Kare Raceway.

Personal life
Jerry was the father of Randy Churchill, who also competed in NASCAR. Together they are one of only 7 father-son duo to win races in ARCA Racing Series.

Motorsports career results

NASCAR
(key) (Bold – Pole position awarded by qualifying time. Italics – Pole position earned by points standings or practice time. * – Most laps led.)

Grand National Series

Winston Cup Series

Daytona 500

SuperTruck Series

ARCA Re/Max Series
(key) (Bold – Pole position awarded by qualifying time. Italics – Pole position earned by points standings or practice time. * – Most laps led.)

References

External links
 

1938 births
2008 deaths
Canadian racing drivers
Sportspeople from Windsor, Ontario
Racing drivers from Ontario
NASCAR drivers
ARCA Menards Series drivers